Siddiq Patni (born 18 June 1964) is a Pakistani former cricketer. He played 41 first-class and 16 List A matches for several domestic teams in Pakistan between 1979 and 1992.

See also
 List of Pakistan Automobiles Corporation cricketers

References

External links
 

1964 births
Living people
Pakistani cricketers
Karachi Blues cricketers
National Bank of Pakistan cricketers
Pakistan Automobiles Corporation cricketers
Pakistan National Shipping Corporation cricketers
United Bank Limited cricketers
Cricketers from Karachi